Table Talk: A Journal for Men and Women, was a weekly magazine published from 26 June 1885 until September 1939 in Melbourne, Australia. It was established in 1885 by Maurice Brodzky (1847–1919), who obtained financial assistance to start his own publication after resigning from The Herald.

Table Talk was a social magazine that catered for both male and female readers. It included articles about politics, finance, literature, arts, and social notes. Its gossip style attracted readers with articles about local notables and famous people from overseas commenting on, among other things, their fashion, relationships, and social engagements. It was most popular during Melbourne's boom in the 1880s.

In September 1924, it was sold for a reported £15,000.

In 1899, Table Talks format changed to include different font sizes and photographs and in 1926 it absorbed the illustrated magazine, Punch. The last issue was dated 7 September 1939.

It had a Folio size format, and initially was 16 pages, increasing to 20 pages by 1885 and was 24 pages by 1888. It was initially sold for threepence and the price had increased to sixpence by 1903.

Personnel
Eugenia Stone, reporter, poetry. Notably married Sir George Dpughty.

References

External links 
Digitised Table Talk from the National Library of Australia

Defunct magazines published in Australia
Weekly magazines published in Australia
Magazines established in 1885
Magazines disestablished in 1939
1939 disestablishments in Australia
Magazines published in Melbourne